Asemochrysus is a genus of beetles in the family Buprestidae, containing the following species:

 Asemochrysus rugulosus Deyrolle, 1864
 Asemochrysus zoufali (Obenberger, 1928)

References

Buprestidae genera